In enzymology, a 2-methylcitrate synthase is an enzyme that catalyzes the chemical reaction

propanoyl-CoA + H2O + oxaloacetate  (2R,3S)-2-hydroxybutane-1,2,3-tricarboxylate + CoA

The 3 substrates of this enzyme are propanoyl-CoA, H2O, and oxaloacetate, whereas its two products are (2R,3S)-2-hydroxybutane-1,2,3-tricarboxylate and CoA.

This enzyme belongs to the family of transferases, specifically those acyltransferases that convert acyl groups into alkyl groups on transfer.  The systematic name of this enzyme class is propanoyl-CoA:oxaloacetate C-propanoyltransferase (thioester-hydrolysing, 1-carboxyethyl-forming). Other names in common use include 2-methylcitrate oxaloacetate-lyase, MCS, methylcitrate synthase, and methylcitrate synthetase.  This enzyme participates in propanoate metabolism.

References

 
 
 
 

EC 2.3.3
Enzymes of unknown structure